Marieux is a commune in the Somme department in Hauts-de-France in northern France.

Geography

History
The château was built in 1777 and is still owned and occupied by the same family today. Marieux is on the once strategically important and well-protected Roman road leading from Amiens to the English Channel and Britain.

During the First World War, it was British army headquarters for this part of the western front. On 25 October 1915, George V lunched here at the château with French Président Poincaré and the Chiefs-of-Staff of the French and British armies.

Population

See also
Communes of the Somme department

References

Communes of Somme (department)